Neomycin/polymyxin B/bacitracin, also known as triple antibiotic ointment, is a medication used to reduce the risk of infections following minor skin injuries. It contains three antibiotics: neomycin, polymyxin B, and bacitracin. It is for topical use only and should not be ingested due to risk of kidney damage.

Possible side effects include itchiness and skin rash, and in rare cases hearing loss. Use in pregnancy is generally recommended. It is relatively broad spectrum, being effective against both Gram-negative and Gram-positive bacteria.

The combination was approved for medical use in the United States in 1971. It is available over the counter in the United States. In 2020, it was the 409th most commonly prescribed medication in the United States, with more than 100thousand prescriptions.

Medical uses 
Neomycin/polymyxin B/bacitracin ointment is reported to be a safe and effective topical agent for preventing infections in minor skin trauma.

It is used for burns, scratches, cuts, and minor skin infections. The ointment is most effective when applied after cleaning the affected area.

The use of neomycin/polymyxin B/bacitracin, decreases infection rates in minor-contaminated wounds. However, if the wound is sterile, then there are no benefits compared to petrolatum (placebo).

Side effects 
It is for external use only and should not be applied near mucous membranes such as the eyes or mouth. It is not recommended for children under the age of two. Users should immediately seek medical attention if they experience hives, rashes, or itching. Any skin irritations such as pain, burning, or cracked skin that were not present prior to use of ointment must receive immediate care.

It has been shown to cause contact dermatitis in some cases.

Antibiotic-resistant bacteria 
Concern exists that its use contributes to the emergence of antibiotic-resistant bacteria. In the US, the only large market for the ointment, it may increase antibiotic resistance. For instance, it may increase the prevalence of methicillin-resistant Staphylococcus aureus (MRSA) bacteria, specifically the highly lethal ST8:USA300 strain.

Components
The original ointment contains three different antibiotics: bacitracin, neomycin, and polymyxin B, in a relatively low-molecular-weight base of cocoa butter, cottonseed oil, sodium pyruvate, tocopheryl acetate, and petroleum jelly.

The generic name for these products, regardless of the base, is "triple antibiotic ointment".
In China, the product (with lidocaine) is named "compound polymyxin B ointment" and is manufactured there by Zhejiang Fonow Medicine Co. Ltd. The product was also marketed by the Upjohn Company under the name "Mycitracin", until 1997 when that name was acquired by Johnson & Johnson.

Some people have allergic reactions to neomycin, so a "double antibiotic ointment" is sold without it, containing only
bacitracin and polymyxin B: one such example is Polysporin branded product.

A "Plus" variant of the ointment exists that adds the analgesic pramoxine, but uses the cheap, simple, long-lasting, but heavier petroleum jelly base, common to many over-the-counter topicals.  The latest version of this analgesic formulation, a high-absorption cream, excludes bacitracin because it is unstable in such a base.

Active ingredients 
The three main active ingredients in Neomycin are neomycin sulfate, polymyxin B sulfate, and bacitracin zinc.

One of the main components is neomycin sulfate, which is a type of antibiotic discovered in 1949 by microbiologist Selman Waksman at Rutgers University. Neomycin belongs to the aminoglycoside class of antibiotics and fights against Gram positive and gram negative bacteria. The antibiotic is often used to prevent risk of bacterial infections. Aminoglycosides work by binding to bacterial RNA and changing the ability to produce proteins while exerting little to no effect on DNA. Thus, neomycin kills bacteria as a result of irregular protein production in the bacterial cell. When the cell can no longer produce the correct proteins, its membrane becomes damaged. As a result of damaged membrane, the affected bacterial cells die, and the infection is prevented or limited.

Like neomycin, polymyxin B is an antibiotic. Polymyxin B forms holes in the bacterial cell wall causing the internal cellular components to leak out, resulting in cell death.

Pramoxine is used to temporarily reduce pain from burns, insect bites, and minor cuts. It works like an anesthetic by decreasing the permeability of neuron membranes. As a result, pain neurons in the area have difficulty sending signals (or signals are blocked entirely), resulting in numbness.

In some countries bacitracin is replaced with gramicidin.

History 
There is no exact date as to when the antibacterial ointment was invented, but it was used as early as the 1950s. This antibiotic ointment was patented in the United States on August 27, 1951.

References

External links 
 
 
 

Combination antibiotics
Polypeptide antibiotics
Wikipedia medicine articles ready to translate